Georgian passports are issued to citizens of Georgia to facilitate international travel.

Visa requirements

As of January 10, 2023, Georgian citizens had visa-free or visa on arrival access to 116 countries and territories, ranking the Georgian passport 50th in terms of travel freedom according to the Henley Passport Index.

See also
Visa requirements for Georgian citizens
Visa policy of Georgia
List of passports
 E.U. Eastern Partnership Program

References

Passports by country
Government of Georgia (country)
Foreign relations of Georgia (country)